Dalian Yuming Senior High School (Chinese:) is a public high school in Dalian, Liaoning, China. It is known for its specialty on Chinese Science Olympiad, and is highly considered among all senior high schools in China. The school is also known for its annual bonfire night.

History 
Dalian Yuming High School was established in 1998 by former mayor Bo Xilai.

Academics 
Upon establishment, the school continuously developed its specialty in Chinese Science Olympiad, and gained a reputation for winning many prizes and medals in it, which turned out to advance the reputation and success rate when their students apply for autonomous enrollments of famous Chinese colleges, especially those in project 985 and project 211. Some prize winning students were selected to compete in International Science Olympiads.

Yuming is regarded as one of the best high schools in Dalian because of its education quality and overall college enrolment rate, being frequently compared with No. 24 High School.

Bonfire night 

Every year at the end of April, Yuming hosts a bonfire night to commemorate the upcoming Youth Day, and to enjoy the Labour Day vacation in advance. The event usually starts after midday, and ends after dark. It features barbecues, student performance (usually singing and dancing), and ignition of the bonfire by the principal towards the end of the event.

References

External links 
 Dalian Yuming High School Home Page 

High schools in Dalian
Educational institutions established in 1998
1998 establishments in China